SM UB-24 was a German Type UB II submarine or U-boat in the German Imperial Navy during World War I. The U-boat was ordered on 30 April 1915 and launched on 18 October 1915. She was commissioned into the German Imperial Navy on 18 November 1915 as SM UB-24. The submarine was surrendered to France in accordance with the requirements of the Armistice with Germany on 24 November 1918 and broken up in Cherbourg in July 1921.

Design
A German Type UB II submarine, UB-24 had a displacement of  when at the surface and  while submerged. The submarine was powered by two Benz six-cylinder diesel engines producing a total , two Siemens-Schuckert electric motor producing , and one propeller shaft.

UB-24 was fitted with two  torpedo tubes, four torpedoes, and one  SK L/40 deck gun. She had a complement of twenty-one crew members and two officers and a thirty-second dive time.

Notes

References

Bibliography 

 

1915 ships
Ships built in Bremen (state)
World War I submarines of Germany
German Type UB II submarines
U-boats commissioned in 1915